Çiləgir (also, Chilegir and Chilagir) is a village in the Khachmaz Rayon of Azerbaijan.  It has a population of 1,355.

References 

Populated places in Khachmaz District